Navigant Consulting, Inc. was an American management consultancy firm. It had offices in Asia, Europe and North America; the head office was in Chicago, Illinois. The stock was a component of the S&P 600 index. Navigant was acquired by Guidehouse in 2019.

History
The company was formed in 1983 by Richard Metzler as The Metzler Group Inc.; it provided management consultancy to businesses in the energy and other regulated industries. It was listed on NASDAQ in October 1996, under the ticker symbol METZ. In July 1999 the name was changed to Navigant Consulting, Inc.; the stock was listed on the New York Stock Exchange soon afterwards. William M. Goodyear became chairman and CEO of the company in 2000. 

In 2005, the company was accused of overcharging Los Angeles County in a contract to work at Martin Luther King Jr.-Harbor Hospital in Willowbrook, CA. County auditors rejected over $206,000 in expenses, including unauthorized first-class airfares to and from Los Angeles, and determined that Navigant had deleted from their to-do list a number of tasks and goals that they had failed to accomplish. Despite Navigant's work, King-Harbor failed to meet federal standards for Medicare funding in 2006, prompting the county to undergo a radical restructuring plan for the hospital.

In 2012, Julie Howard replaced Goodyear as CEO. In April 2018, the company partnered with Baptist Health South Florida to form a joint venture providing revenue cycle management to healthcare organizations. The dispute and investigative division of the company was sold to Ankura Consulting in August 2018.

Reception 
 The Hot 100, Fortune, September 2005.
Perfect score, Human Rights Campaign's Corporate Equality Index 2018 for LGBTQ equality.

References

External links
 

Companies formerly listed on the New York Stock Exchange
Companies formerly listed on the Nasdaq
American companies established in 1983
Consulting firms established in 1983
Management consulting firms of the United States
1996 initial public offerings
Companies based in Chicago
2019 mergers and acquisitions
1983 establishments in the United States
1983 establishments in Illinois
Companies established in 1983